Peter the Great is a 1986 American biographical historical drama television miniseries directed by Marvin J. Chomsky and Lawrence Schiller, based on Robert K. Massie's 1980 non-fiction book Peter the Great: His Life and World. It stars an ensemble cast consisting of Maximilian Schell, Vanessa Redgrave, Omar Sharif, Trevor Howard, Laurence Olivier, Helmut Griem, Jan Niklas, Elke Sommer, Renée Soutendijk, Ursula Andress, and Mel Ferrer.

The miniseries received generally positive reviews from critics and won three Primetime Emmy Awards, including Outstanding Miniseries. It was also nominated for three Golden Globe Awards, including Best Miniseries or Television Film.

Cast
 Maximilian Schell as Peter the Great
 Jan Niklas as Peter the Great in early adulthood
 Vanessa Redgrave as Tsarevna Sophia
 Omar Sharif as Prince Feodor Romodanovsky 
 Laurence Olivier as William III and II, King of England, Scotland and Ireland
 Trevor Howard as Sir Isaac Newton
 Ursula Andress as Athalie
 Olegar Fedoro as Boyar Lopukhin
 Natalya Andrejchenko as Tsaritsa Eudoxia Lopukhina
 Helmut Griem as Captain Alexander Menshikov
 Renée Soutendijk as Anna Mons (Peter's Dutch mistress)
 Hanna Schygulla as Catherine Skavronskaya (Peter's 2nd mistress and later on wife)
 Christoph Eichhorn as Charles XII, King of Sweden
 Lilli Palmer as Tsarina Natalya, mother of Peter the Great
 Mel Ferrer as Frederick I, King in Prussia
 Elke Sommer as Charlotte, Queen in Prussia
 Jan Malmsjö as The Patriarch
 Boris Plotnikov as Tsarevich Alexis
 Jeremy Kemp as General Patrick Gordon
 Geoffrey Whitehead as Prince Vasily Golitsyn
 Graham McGrath as young adult Peter the Great
 Dennis DeMarne as the figure of Peter the Great at the narrating scenes of the later years
Ann Zacharias as Daria Lund, the mistress of Captain Alexander Menshikov
 Algis Arlauskas as Father Theodosius

The series was released as a three-tape VHS box (set in 1992, then, in 1994, as a single, lengthy VHS tape).

Awards and nominations

References

 The Complete Films of Laurence Olivier by Jerry Vermilye, Citadel Press, 1992.

External links
 
 

1986 American television series debuts
1986 American television series endings
1980s American drama television series
1980s American television miniseries
American biographical series
American historical television series
Cultural depictions of Peter the Great
Cultural depictions of Isaac Newton
Cultural depictions of William III of England
NBC original programming
Primetime Emmy Award for Outstanding Miniseries winners
Television shows based on biographies
Television shows set in Russia
Television series set in the 17th century
Television series set in the 18th century
Films directed by Marvin J. Chomsky